Lưu Văn Hùng (born 3 October 1966) is a Vietnamese long-distance runner. He competed in the men's marathon at the 1992 Summer Olympics.

References

External links
 

1966 births
Living people
Athletes (track and field) at the 1992 Summer Olympics
Vietnamese male long-distance runners
Vietnamese male marathon runners
Olympic athletes of Vietnam
Place of birth missing (living people)